The Burnaya is a young rapid river in Priozersky District of Leningrad Oblast, Russia, on the Karelian Isthmus, which emerged in 1818. It flows from Lake Sukhodolskoye to Lake Ladoga and is a part of Vuoksi River drainage basin. Before the Winter War and Continuation War it was located in Finland, known under the name Taipaleenjoki.

Originally waters of Lake Suvanto (Lake Sukhodolskoye) quietly flowed into the Vuoksi through a waterway at Kiviniemi. The Kiviniemi waterway dried out. In 1857 the channel was dug there, but the stream reversed direction, revealed rapids and rendered navigation at Kiviniemi impossible.

References 

Rivers of Leningrad Oblast
Karelian Isthmus
0Burnaya